The Space Launch System (SLS) is an American super heavy-lift expendable launch vehicle developed by NASA. As of 2022, SLS has the highest payload capacity of any rocket in operational service, as well as the greatest liftoff thrust of any rocket in operation. As the primary launch vehicle of the Artemis moon landing program, SLS is designed to launch the crewed Orion spacecraft on a trans-lunar trajectory. The first SLS launch was the uncrewed Artemis 1, which took place on 16 November 2022 after a delay of more than six years.

Development of SLS began in 2011, as a replacement for the retired Space Shuttle as well as the cancelled Ares I and Ares V launch vehicles. As a Shuttle-derived vehicle, the Space Launch System reuses hardware from the Space Shuttle program, including the solid rocket boosters and RS-25 first stage engines. An original flight date of late 2016 was delayed by nearly 6 years. The SLS program has attracted criticism for such delays, high cost, and non-competitive use of Space Shuttle components and contractors.

All Space Launch System flights are launched from LC-39B at the Kennedy Space Center in Florida. The first three SLS flights use the Block 1 configuration, comprising extended Space Shuttle boosters developed for Ares I and the ICPS upper stage. An improved Block 1B configuration, with the EUS upper stage, is planned to debut on the fourth flight; a further improved Block 2 configuration featuring new solid rocket boosters is planned to debut on the ninth flight. After the first four flights, NASA plans to transfer production and launch operations of SLS to Deep Space Transport LLC, a joint venture between Boeing and Northrop Grumman.

Description 

The SLS is a Space Shuttle-derived launch vehicle. The first stage of the rocket is powered by one central core stage and two outboard solid rocket boosters. All SLS Blocks share a common core stage design, while they differ in their upper stages and boosters.

Core stage 

Together with the solid rocket boosters, the core stage is responsible for propelling the upper stage and payload out of the atmosphere to near orbital velocity. It contains the liquid hydrogen and liquid oxygen tanks for the ascent phase, the forward and aft solid rocket booster attach points, avionics, and the Main Propulsion System (MPS), an assembly of the four RS-25 engines, associated plumbing and hydraulic gimbal actuators, and equipment for autogenous pressurization of the vehicle's tanks. The core stage provides approximately 25% of the vehicle's thrust at liftoff.

The first four flights will each use and expend four of the remaining sixteen RS-25D engines previously flown on Space Shuttle missions. Aerojet Rocketdyne refits these engines with modernized engine controllers, higher throttle limits, as well as insulation for the high temperatures the engine section will experience due to their position adjacent to the solid rocket boosters. Later flights will switch to a RS-25 variant optimized for expended use, the RS-25E, which will lower per-engine costs by over 30%.

Boosters 
Blocks 1 and 1B of the SLS will use two five-segment solid rocket boosters. These solid rocket boosters use casing segments that were flown on Shuttle missions as parts of the four-segment Space Shuttle Solid Rocket Boosters. They possess an additional center segment, new avionics, and lighter insulation, but lack a parachute recovery system, as they will not be recovered after launch. The propellants for the solid rocket boosters are aluminum powder, which is very reactive, and ammonium perchlorate, a powerful oxidizer. They are held together by a binder, polybutadiene acrylonitrile (PBAN). The mixture has the consistency of a rubber eraser and is packed into each segment. The five-segment solid rocket boosters provide approximately 25% more total impulse than the Shuttle Solid Rocket Boosters, but will not be recovered after use.

The stock of SLS Block 1 to 1B boosters is limited by the number of casings left over from the Shuttle program, which allows for eight flights of the SLS. On 2 March 2019, the Booster Obsolescence and Life Extension program was announced. This program will develop new solid rocket boosters, to be built by Northrop Grumman Space Systems, for further SLS flights, marking the beginning of Block 2. , the BOLE program is under development, with first firing expected in 2024.

Upper stages 

The Interim Cryogenic Propulsion Stage (ICPS) flew on Artemis 1, and is planned for Artemis 2 and 3 as the upper stage of SLS Block 1. It is a stretched and human-rated Delta IV  Delta Cryogenic Second Stage powered by a single RL10 engine. The Artemis 1 ICPS used the RL10B-2 variant, while the ICPS for Artemis 2 and Artemis 3 will use the RL10C-2 variant. Block 1 is intended to be capable of lifting  to low Earth orbit (LEO) in this configuration, including the weight of the ICPS as part of the payload. At the time of SLS core stage separation, Artemis 1 was travelling on an initial  suborbital trajectory. This trajectory ensured safe disposal of the core stage. ICPS then performed orbital insertion and a subsequent translunar injection burn to send Orion towards the Moon. The ICPS will be human-rated for the crewed Artemis 2 and 3 flights.

The Exploration Upper Stage (EUS) is planned to fly on Artemis 4. The EUS will complete the SLS ascent phase and then re-ignite to send its payload to destinations beyond LEO. It is expected to be used by Block 1B and Block 2. The EUS shares the core stage diameter of 8.4 meters, and will be powered by four RL10C-3 engines. It will eventually be upgraded to use four improved RL10C-X engines. , Boeing is developing a new composite-based fuel tank for the EUS that would increase Block 1B's overall payload mass capacity to TLI by 40 percent. The improved upper stage was originally named the Dual Use Upper Stage (DUUS, pronounced "duce") but was later renamed the Exploration Upper Stage (EUS).

Block variants

Development

Funding 
During the joint Senate-NASA presentation in September 2011, it was stated that the SLS program had a projected development cost of US$18 billion through 2017, with $10 billion for the SLS rocket, $6 billion for the Orion spacecraft, and $2 billion for upgrades to the launch pad and other facilities at Kennedy Space Center. These costs and schedules were considered optimistic in an independent 2011 cost assessment report by Booz Allen Hamilton for NASA. An internal 2011 NASA document estimated the cost of the program through 2025 to total at least $41 billion for four  launches (1 uncrewed, 3 crewed), with the  version ready no earlier than 2030. The Human Exploration Framework Team estimated unit costs for 'Block 0' at $1.6 billion and Block 1 at $1.86 billion in 2010. However, since these estimates were made the Block 0 SLS vehicle was dropped in late 2011, and the design was not completed.

In September 2012, an SLS deputy project manager stated that $500 million is a reasonable target average cost per flight for the SLS program. In 2013, the Space Review estimated the cost per launch at $5 billion, depending on the rate of launches. NASA announced in 2013 that the European Space Agency will build the Orion service module. In August 2014, as the SLS program passed its Key Decision Point C review and was deemed ready to enter full development, costs from February 2014 until its planned launch in September 2018 were estimated at $7.021 billion. Ground systems modifications and construction would require an additional $1.8 billion over the same time.

In October 2018, NASA's Inspector General reported that the Boeing core stage contract had made up 40% of the $11.9 billion spent on the SLS as of August 2018. By 2021, development of the core stage was expected to have cost $8.9 billion, twice the initially planned amount. In December 2018, NASA estimated that yearly budgets for the SLS will range from $2.1 to $2.3 billion between 2019 and 2023.

In March 2019, the Trump administration released its fiscal year 2020 budget request for NASA, which notably proposed dropped funding for Block 1B and Block 2 variants of SLS. Congressional action ultimately included the funding in the passed budget. One Gateway component that had been previously planned for the SLS Block 1B is expected to fly on the Falcon Heavy.

Budget 
For fiscal years 2011 through 2022, the SLS program had expended funding totaling $23.8 billion in nominal dollars. This is equivalent to $27.5 billion in 2022 dollars using the NASA New Start Inflation Indices.

Included in the above SLS costs above are (1) the Interim Cryogenic Propulsion Stage (ICPS), a $412 million contract and (2) the costs of developing the Exploration Upper Stage (below).

Excluded from the SLS cost above are the costs to assemble, integrate, prepare and launch the SLS and its payloads, funded separately in the NASA Exploration Ground Systems, currently at about $600 million per year, and anticipated to stay there through at least the first four launches of SLS. Also excluded are payloads that launch on the SLS, such as the Orion crew capsule. Also excluded are predecessor programs that contributed to the development of the SLS, such as the Ares V Cargo Launch Vehicle project, funded from 2008 to 2010 for a total of $70 million, and the Ares I Crew Launch Vehicle, funded from 2006 to 2010 for a total of $4.8 billion in development, including the 5-segment Solid Rocket Boosters used on the SLS.

Launch costs 
Estimates of the per launch costs for the SLS have varied widely, partly due to uncertainty over how much the program will expend during development and testing before the operational launches begin, and partly due to various agencies using differing cost measures; but also based on differing purposes for which the cost estimates were developed. For example, a marginal cost per one additional launch ignores the development and annual recurring fixed costs, whereas a total cost per launch includes recurring costs but excludes development.

There are no official NASA estimates for how much the SLS will cost per launch, nor for the SLS program annual recurring costs once operational. Cost per launch is not a straightforward figure to estimate as it depends heavily on how many launches occur per year. For example, similarly, the Space Shuttle was estimated, in 2012 dollars, to cost $576 million per launch had it been able to achieve 7 launches per year, while the marginal cost of adding a single additional launch in a given year was estimated to be less than half of that, at just $252 million of marginal cost. However, at the rate that it flew, the final cost was $1.64 billion per Space Shuttle launch, including development.

NASA associate administrator William H. Gerstenmaier said in 2017 that there would be no official per flight cost estimates of any variety provided by NASA for the SLS. Other bodies, such as the Government Accountability Office (GAO), the NASA Office of Inspector General, the Senate Appropriations Committee, and the White House Office of Management and Budget have put out cost per launch figures, however. Several internal NASA programs and project concept study reports have released proposed budgets that include future SLS launches. For example, a concept study report for a space telescope stated it was advised by NASA HQ in 2019 to budget $500 million for an SLS launch in 2035. Another study in 2019 also proposing a space telescope assumed a budget for their launch of $650 million in current-day dollars, or $925 million for when the launch would occur, also in the "mid-2030s".

Europa Clipper is a NASA scientific mission that was initially required by Congress to launch on SLS. Oversight bodies both internal and external to NASA disagreed with this requirement. First, NASA's Inspector General office published a report in May 2019 that stated Europa Clipper would need to give up $876 million for the "marginal cost" of its SLS launch. An addendum to the letter published in August 2019 increased the estimate and stated that switching to a commercial rocket would save over $1 billion. Ultimately, Europa Clipper was rebooked to launch on a Falcon Heavy for a contract price of $178 million — saving $2 billion in launch costs compared to SLS. The move was done not only for cost reasons but also due to unacceptably high vibration loads on SLS, and concerns over the availability of spare SLS vehicles from the Artemis program.

A JCL (Joint Cost and Schedule Confidence Level) analysis cited in that letter put the cost savings at $700 million, with the SLS at $1.05 billion per launch and the commercial alternative at $350 million. Finally, a letter from the White House Office of Management and Budget (OMB) to the Senate Appropriations Committee in October 2019 revealed that SLS's total cost to the taxpayer was estimated at "over $2 billion" per launch after development is complete; said development has cost $23 billion in 2021 dollars. The letter suggested Congress remove this requirement, agreeing the NASA Inspector General, adding that using a commercial launch vehicle for Europa Clipper instead of the SLS would save $1.5 billion overall. NASA did not deny this $2 billion cost of launch and an agency spokesperson stated it "is working to bring down the cost of a single SLS launch in a given year as the agency continues negotiations with Boeing on the long-term production contract and efforts to finalize contracts and costs for other elements of the rocket".

This OMB figure is dependent on the rate of construction, so building more SLS rockets faster could decrease the per-unit cost. For example, Exploration Ground Systems – whose only role is to support, assemble, integrate, and launch SLS – has separately budgeted fixed costs of $600 million per year on facilities, spread across however many rockets launch that year. Then, in December 2019, NASA Administrator Jim Bridenstine shared informally that he disagrees with the $2 billion figure since the marginal cost of an SLS launch should decrease after the first few, and is expected to end up around $800 million to $900 million, although contract negotiations were only just beginning for those later cores.

In November 2021 a new NASA Office of Inspector General audit was released, which estimated that, at least for the first four launches of SLS, the per-launch production and operating costs would be $2.2 billion for SLS, plus $568 million for Exploration Ground Systems. Additionally, since the first four missions are under the Artemis program, the payload would cost $1 billion for Orion and $300 million for the ESA service module.

Early plans 

The SLS was created by an act of Congress in the "NASA Authorization Act of 2010", Public Law 111–267, in which NASA was directed to create a system for launching payloads and crew into space that would replace the capabilities lost with the retirement of the Space Shuttle. The act set out certain goals, such as being able to lift 130 tons or more of payload into low earth orbit, a target date of December 31, 2016 for the system to be fully operational, and a directive to use "to the extent practicable" existing components, hardware, and workforce from the Space Shuttle and from Ares I. On 14 September 2011, NASA announced their plan to meet these requirements: the design for the SLS, with the Orion spacecraft as payload.

The SLS has considered several future development routes of potential launch configurations, with the planned evolution of the blocks of the rocket having been modified many times. Many options, all of which just needed to meet the congressionally mandated payload minimums, were considered, including a Block 0 variant with three main engines, a variant with five main engines, a Block 1A variant with upgraded boosters instead of the improved second stage, and a Block 2 with five main engines plus the Earth Departure Stage, with up to three J-2X engines.

In the initial announcement of the design of the SLS, NASA also announced an "Advanced Booster Competition", to select which boosters would be used on Block 2 of the SLS. Several companies proposed boosters for this competition, all of which were indicated as viable: Aerojet and Teledyne Brown proposed three booster engines each with dual combustion chambers, Alliant Techsystems proposed a modified solid rocket booster with lighter casing, more energetic propellant, and four segments instead of five, and Pratt & Whitney Rocketdyne and Dynetics proposed a liquid-fueled booster named Pyrios. However, this competition was planned for a development plan in which Block 1A would be followed by Block 2A, with upgraded boosters. NASA canceled Block 1A and the planned competition in April 2014, in favor of simply remaining with the Ares I's five-segment solid rocket boosters, themselves modified from the Space Shuttle's solid rocket boosters, until at least the late 2020s. The overly powerful advanced booster would have resulted in unsuitably high acceleration, and would need modifications to LC-39B, its flame trench, and Mobile Launcher.

On 31 July 2013, the SLS passed Preliminary Design Review. The review included not only the rocket and boosters but also ground support and logistical arrangements.

On 7 August 2014, the SLS Block 1 passed a milestone known as Key Decision Point C and entered full-scale development, with an estimated launch date of November 2018.

EUS options 
In 2013, NASA and Boeing analyzed the performance of several EUS engine options. The analysis was based on a second-stage usable propellant load of 105 metric tons, and compared stages with four RL10 engines, two MARC-60 engines, or one J-2X engine. In 2014, NASA also considered using the European Vinci instead of the RL10, which offered the same specific impulse but with 64% greater thrust, which would allow for the same performance at a lower cost.

In 2018, Blue Origin submitted a proposal to replace the Exploration Upper Stage with a cheaper alternative to be designed and fabricated by the company, but it was rejected by NASA in November 2019 on multiple grounds; these included lower performance compared to the existing EUS design, incompatibility of the proposal with the height of the door of the Vehicle Assembly Building being only , and unacceptable acceleration of Orion components such as its solar panels due to the higher thrust of the engines being used for the fuel tank.

SRB tests 
From 2009 to 2011, three full-duration static fire tests of five-segment solid rocket boosters were conducted under the Constellation Program, including tests at low and high core temperatures, to validate performance at extreme temperatures. The 5-segment solid rocket booster would be carried over to SLS. Northrop Grumman Innovation Systems has completed full-duration static fire tests of the five-segment solid rocket boosters. Qualification Motor 1 was tested on 10 March 2015. Qualification Motor 2 was successfully tested on 28 June 2016.

Operation

Construction 

, three SLS versions are planned: Block 1, Block 1B, and Block 2. Each will use the same Core stage with its four main engines, but Block 1B will feature the Exploration Upper Stage (EUS), and Block 2 will combine the EUS with upgraded boosters.

The ICPS for Artemis 1 was delivered by ULA to NASA about July 2017 and was housed at Kennedy Space Centre as of November 2018.

Construction of core stage 
In mid-November 2014, construction of the first Core Stage hardware began using a new welding system in the South Vertical Assembly Building at NASA's Michoud Assembly Facility. Between 2015 and 2017, NASA test fired RS-25 engines in preparation for use on SLS.

The core stage for the first SLS, built at Michoud Assembly Facility by Boeing, had all four engines attached in November 2019, and it was declared finished by NASA in December 2019.

The first core stage left Michoud Assembly Facility for comprehensive testing at Stennis Space Center in January 2020. The static firing test program at Stennis Space Center, known as the Green Run, operated all the core stage systems simultaneously for the first time. Test 7 (of 8), the wet dress rehearsal, was carried out in December 2020 and the fire (test 8) took place on 16 January 2021, but shut down earlier than expected, about 67 seconds in total rather than the desired eight minutes. The reason for the early shutdown was later reported to be because of conservative test commit criteria on the thrust vector control system, specific only for ground testing and not for flight. If this scenario occurred during a flight, the rocket would have continued to fly normally. There was no sign of damage to the core stage or the engines, contrary to initial concerns. The second fire test was completed on 18 March 2021, with all 4 engines igniting, throttling down as expected to simulate in-flight conditions, and gimballing profiles. The core stage was shipped to Kennedy Space Center to be mated with the rest of the rocket for Artemis 1. It left Stennis on April 24 and arrived at Kennedy on April 27. It was refurbished there in preparation for stacking. On 12 June 2021, NASA announced the assembly of the first SLS rocket was completed at the Kennedy Space Center. The assembled SLS was used for the uncrewed Artemis 1 mission in 2022.

The first SLS for Artemis 1 flew to the moon on a test flight in fall 2022, and currently, NASA and Boeing are constructing the next three rockets for Artemis 2, Artemis 3, and Artemis 4. Boeing stated in July 2021 that while the COVID-19 pandemic had affected their suppliers and schedules, such as delaying parts needed for hydraulics, they would still be able to provide the Artemis 2 SLS core stage per NASA's schedule, with months to spare. The spray-on foam insulation process for Artemis 2 has been automated for most sections of the core stage, saving 12 days in the schedule. The Artemis 2 forward skirt, which is the foremost component of the core stage, was affixed on the liquid oxygen tank in late May 2021. , the complete core stage is set to ship to NASA in May 2023, two months later than was predicted originally. For Artemis 3, assembly of elements of the thrust structure began at Michoud Assembly Facility in early 2021. The liquid hydrogen tank that is to be used on Artemis 3 was originally planned to be the Artemis 1 tank, but it was set aside as the welds were found to be faulty. Repair techniques were developed, and the tank has reentered production and will be proof tested for strength, for use on Artemis 3.

Construction of EUS for Block 1B 
As of July 2021, Boeing is also preparing to begin construction of the Exploration Upper Stage (EUS), which is planned to debut on Artemis 4.

Launches 

Originally planned for late 2016, the uncrewed first flight of SLS slipped more than twenty-six times and almost six years. As of earlier that month, the first launch was originally scheduled for 8:30 am EDT, 29 August 2022. It was postponed to 2:17 pm EDT (18:17 UTC), 3 September 2022, after the launch director called a scrub due to a temperature sensor falsely indicating that an RS-25 engine's hydrogen bleed intake was too warm. The 3 September attempt was then scrubbed due to a hydrogen leak in the tail service mast quick disconnect arm, which was fixed; the next launch option was at first a period in late October and then a launch in mid-November, due to unfavorable weather during Hurricane Ian. It launched on November 16.

NASA originally limited the amount of time the solid rocket boosters can remain stacked to "about a year" from the time two segments are joined. The first and second segments of the Artemis 1 boosters were joined on 7 January 2021. NASA could choose to extend the time limit based on an engineering review. On 29 September 2021, Northrop Grumman indicated that the limit could be extended to eighteen months for Artemis 1, based on an analysis of the data collected when the boosters were being stacked; an analysis weeks before the actual launch date later extended that to December 2022 for the boosters of Artemis 1, almost two years after stacking.

In March 2023, NASA announced they had delayed Artemis 2 to November 2024.

Usage beyond Artemis 

Although the SLS is only confirmed for use on the first few Artemis missions, several NASA mission concept studies for robotic missions considered launching on the SLS. These include: 
Neptune Odyssey, Europa Lander, Enceladus Orbilander, Persephone, HabEx, Origins Space Telescope, LUVOIR, Lynx, and Interstellar probe. These concept studies were prepared for possible recommendation by the National Academy's Decadal surveys. The Astronomy and Astrophysics Decadal Survey in 2021 recommended a smaller, merged version of HabEx and LUVOIR preceded by a technology maturation program to reduce cost and schedule risk, although the eventual mission may or may not use SLS. In 2022 the Planetary Science Decadal Survey recommended Enceladus Orbilander as the third highest priority for flagship planetary missions in the 2020s. The Heliophysics Decadal Survey, due to be completed in 2024, is considering the Interstellar Probe mission concept.

Criticism 
The SLS has been criticized based on program cost, lack of commercial involvement, and the non-competitive nature of a vehicle legislated to use Space Shuttle components.

Funding 
In 2011, Rep. Tom McClintock and other groups called on the Government Accountability Office to investigate possible violations of the Competition in Contracting Act, arguing that Congressional mandates forcing NASA to use Space Shuttle components for the SLS are de facto non-competitive, single-source requirements assuring contracts to existing Shuttle suppliers. The Competitive Space Task Force, in September 2011, said that the new government launcher directly violates NASA's charter, the Space Act, and the 1998 Commercial Space Act requirements for NASA to pursue the "fullest possible engagement of commercial providers" and to "seek and encourage, to the maximum extent possible, the fullest commercial use of space". Opponents of the heavy launch vehicle have critically used the name "Senate launch system", a name that was still being used by opponents to criticize the program in 2021, as "the NASA Inspector General said the total cost of the rocket would reach $27 billion through 2025".

Lori Garver, a former NASA Deputy Administrator, called for canceling the launch vehicle alongside the Mars 2020 rover. Phil Plait shared his criticism of the SLS in light of ongoing budget tradeoffs between the Commercial Crew Development and SLS budgets, also referring to earlier critiques by Garver. In 2019, the Government Accountability Office found that NASA had awarded Boeing over $200 million for service with ratings of 'good' to 'excellent' despite cost overruns and delays. , the maiden launch of the SLS was expected in 2021. NASA continued to expect that the first orbital launch would be in 2021 as late as May 2021.

NASA moved out $889 million of costs relating to SLS boosters, but did not update the SLS budget to match, a March 2020 Inspector General report found. This kept the budget overrun to 15% by FY 2019. At 30%, NASA would have to notify Congress and stop funding unless Congress reapproves and provides additional funding. The Inspector General report found that were it not for this "masking" of cost, the overrun would have been 33% by FY 2019. The GAO separately stated "NASA's current approach for reporting cost growth misrepresents the cost performance of the program".

On 1 May 2020, NASA awarded a contract extension to Aerojet Rocketdyne to manufacture 18 additional RS-25 engines with associated services for $1.79 billion, bringing the total RS-25 contract value to almost $3.5 billion. Eric Berger from Ars Technica noted that the average cost of each engine under the contract would be $146 million, with each SLS launch consuming $580 million in its four RS-25 engines alone. Berger further commented that for the cost of a single RS-25 engine, six RD-180 engines (each more powerful than the RS-25) could be purchased, or nearly an entire Falcon Heavy launch with two-thirds of the SLS lift capacity.

Former NASA Administrator Charlie Bolden, who oversaw the initial design and development of the SLS, also criticized the program in an interview with Politico in September 2020. Bolden said that the "SLS will go away ... because at some point commercial entities are going to catch up." Bolden further stated, "They are really going to build a heavy-lift launch vehicle sort of like SLS that they will be able to fly for a much cheaper price than NASA can do SLS. That's just the way it works."

Proposed alternatives 

In 2009, the Augustine commission proposed a commercial  launcher with lower operating costs and noted that a  launcher was the minimum required to support lunar exploration. In 2011–2012, the Space Access Society, Space Frontier Foundation, and The Planetary Society called for the cancellation of the project, arguing that the SLS will consume the funds for other projects from the NASA budget. U.S. Representative Dana Rohrabacher and others proposed that an orbital propellant depot should be developed and the Commercial Crew Development program accelerated instead.

A NASA study that was not publicly released and another from the Georgia Institute of Technology showed this option to be possibly cheaper. In 2012, the United Launch Alliance also suggested using existing rockets with on-orbit assembly and propellant depots as needed. The lack of competition in the SLS design was highlighted. In the summer of 2019, a former ULA employee claimed that Boeing, NASA's prime contractor for SLS, viewed orbital refueling technology as a threat to the SLS and blocked further investment in it. In 2011, Robert Zubrin, founder of Mars Society and Mars Direct, suggested that a heavy lift vehicle could be developed for $5 billion on fixed-price requests for proposal. In 2010, SpaceX's CEO Elon Musk claimed that his company could build a launch vehicle in the  payload range for $2.5 billion, or $300 million (in 2010 dollars) per launch, not including a potential upper-stage upgrade.

See also 

 Austere Human Missions to Mars
 Comparison of orbital launchers families
 Comparison of orbital launch systems
 DIRECT, proposals prior to SLS
 Shuttle-Derived Heavy Lift Launch Vehicle, a 2009 concept launch vehicle
 Ares V, a 2000s cargo vehicle design for the Constellation Program
 National Launch System, 1990s
 Magnum (rocket), a 1990s concept
 Saturn (rocket family), 1960s
 Studied Space Shuttle Variations and Derivatives

Notes

References

External links 

 Space Launch System and Multi-Purpose Crew Vehicle page on NASA.gov
 "Preliminary Report on Multi-Purpose Crew Vehicle and Space Launch System" (PDF), NASA.
 SLS Future Frontiers video
 Video animations of mission to asteroid, the Moon, and Mars, beyondearth.com
 "NASA Continues Journey to Mars Planning", spacepolicyonline.com

 
NASA space launch vehicles
Proposed space launch vehicles
NASA programs
Artemis program
Shuttle-derived space launch vehicles
Articles containing video clips
Lunar Gateway
Rocketry